Peter Ahrendt (2 February 1934 in Rostock – February 2013) was a German sailor who competed in the 1964 Summer Olympics.

References

1934 births
2013 deaths
German male sailors (sport)
Olympic sailors of the United Team of Germany
Sailors at the 1964 Summer Olympics – Dragon
Olympic silver medalists for the United Team of Germany
Olympic medalists in sailing
Sportspeople from Rostock
Medalists at the 1964 Summer Olympics